Gladkovo is a rural locality (a village) in Zaboryinskoye Rural Settlement, Beryozovsky District, Perm Krai, Russia. The population was 10 as of 2010.

Geography 
Gladkovo is located on the Sharlanka River, 7 km southwest of  Beryozovka (the district's administrative centre) by road. Klychi is the nearest rural locality.

References 

Rural localities in Beryozovsky District, Perm Krai